The Floor Is Made Of Lava is a Danish rock band, formed in 2006. The band consists of Tobias Kippenberger (vocals), Simon Visti (bass), Lars Rock (guitar) and Ace (drums).

In 2007 they had their debut, with the album All Juice No Fruit, which was produced by Troels Abrahamsen of Veto. In 2010 they released their second album Howl at the Moon, which was produced by Sebastion Wolff of Kellermensch.

The band have primarily played concerts in Denmark. They've performed at Roskilde Festival, and have warmed up for bands such as Oasis, AC/DC, Nephew and D-A-D.

Discography

Albums
Studio
2007: All Juice, No Fruit
2010: Howl At The Moon
2012: Kids and Drunks
Remix
2008: All Juice, No Fruit Remixed

EPs
2011: Record Store Day (EP)
2012: Record Store Day (EP)

Singles
2007: "Do Your Sister"
2007: "Told Her I'm From Compton"
2008: "Happy Monday"
2010: "All Outta Love"
2010: "Leave Me Now (Leave Me Tomorrow)"
2010: "Harder Than You Think" 
2012: "Lost in the Woods"

References

External links
 

Danish rock music groups
Musical groups established in 2006